Neuroxena funereus is a moth of the  subfamily Arctiinae. It is found in Nigeria.

References

 Natural History Museum Lepidoptera generic names catalog

Endemic fauna of Nigeria
Nyctemerina